Kiseljak is a village in the municipality of Tuzla, Tuzla Canton, Bosnia and Herzegovina. It is located at the northeastern tip of Modrac Lake.

Demographics 
According to the 2013 census, its population was 917.

References

Populated places in Tuzla